Capstan Island is a designated place in the Canadian province of Newfoundland and Labrador.

Located along the Labrador Straits or Strait of Belle Isle, which is a major shipping/export route to oversea destinations, Capstan Island is a small community of 27 residents. It is primarily known for its rich fishing grounds.

Residents lived off the land and sea for primary food/income. Cod fish, crab, scallop, escargot, lumpfish roe, herring and squid, Black duck, murre, pigeons, rabbits, spruced grouse, ptarmigan, caribou, moose, porcupine, beaver, bear were species hunted & fished by most families. Also the fur industry added additional income.

Capstan Island got its name from a capstan located on an island very near to the village. A capstan is a sturdy wooden post and handle, mounted in a stabilizing frame, used to wind in a rope or cable to block seals in the bay. Around 1851 residents began sealing in this area. A large capstan was placed on the small island just offshore and a seal net attached to it. When harp seals migrated along the shore in spring, the net 'box' trapped them. Capstan Island is located in the Labrador Straits region on Route 510 (Trans-Labrador Highway), only 39 km from the Quebec/Labrador border.

There are often icebergs directly across from the community; visitors can go to the fishing wharf and get a view.

Geography 
Capstan Island is in Labrador within Subdivision A of Division No. 10.

Demographics 

See also 
List of communities in Newfoundland and Labrador
List of designated places in Newfoundland and Labrador

References 

Designated places in Newfoundland and Labrador